Lauschgift is the fourth studio album of the German hip hop group Die Fantastischen Vier. It peaked the German charts at position 2, the Austrian at 10, and the Swiss at position 5.

The title—a pun mixing the German noun Rauschgift ("narcotics") with the verb lauschen ("to listen, to eavesdrop")—was inspired by a scene in the film Breakfast at Tiffanys. The German-language dub of the film, in which I. Y. Yunioshi mispronounces the word Rauschgift, was sampled on the album's first track.

Track listing 
"Lauschgift" – 0:17
"Populär" – 3:28
"Sie ist weg" – 3:52
"Frühstück" – 0:39
"Was geht" – 3:58
"Nur in deinem Kopf" – 3:44
"Tokio – Paris" – 0:23
"Die Geschichte des O" – 4:00
"Ich bin" – 1:48
"Hey Baby" – 0:40
"Michi gegen die Gesellschaft" – 4:51
"Brems 2000" – 2:56
"Thomas und die Philosophie" – 4:39
"On the Next Album" – 0:48
"Locker bleiben" – 3:10 (with Rahzel)
"Love Sucks" – 4:20
"Wie die anderen" – 0:53
"Konsum" – 4:30 (with disJam)
"Krieger" – 6:36
"Albert und die Philosophie" – 0:32

Singles

References

External links
 Official website (German)
 Discography at Discogs

1995 albums
Die Fantastischen Vier albums